Megaclite , also known as , is a natural satellite of Jupiter. It was discovered by a team of astronomers from the University of Hawaii led by Scott S. Sheppard in 2000, and given the temporary designation .

Megaclite is about 6 kilometres in diameter, and orbits Jupiter at an average distance of 24,687,000 kilometers in 747.09 days, at an inclination of 150° to the ecliptic (148° to Jupiter's equator), in a retrograde direction and with an eccentricity of 0.308.

It was named in October 2002 after Megaclite, mother by Zeus (Jupiter) of Thebe and Locrus in Greek mythology.

It belongs to the Pasiphae group, irregular retrograde moons orbiting Jupiter at distances ranging between 22.8 and 24.7 Gm, and with inclinations ranging between 144.5° and 158.3°. However, while Pasiphae is gray (B−V=0.74, V−R=0.38, V−I=0.74) in color, Megaclite is light red (B−V=0.94, V−R=0.41, V−I=1.05) and come similar to Callirrhoe.

References 

Pasiphae group
Moons of Jupiter
Irregular satellites
Discoveries by Scott S. Sheppard
Discoveries by David C. Jewitt
Discoveries by Yanga R. Fernandez
Discoveries by Eugene A. Magnier
20001125
Moons with a retrograde orbit